Vyacheslav Adamovich Zarenkov, (born March 28, 1951), is a Belarusian entrepreneur, best known for founding Etalon Group, a construction and development holding based in Saint Petersburg, Russia.

Early life 
Zarenkov was born near the Belarusian city of Orsha, the son of a labourer and collective farmer. He arrived in Leningrad in the early seventies and after graduating from the Leningrad Civil Engineering Institute, joined the ‘Glavzapstroya’ building organization initially as a welder, eventually working his way up to a managerial position. He has a wife, Galina and a son, Dmitry.

Etalon-LenspetsSMU 
In 1987, Zarenkov set up LenspetsSMU, one of the first private companies in the newly formed Russian Federation. Since then, Etalon-LenspetsSMU has grown to become one of the largest operators in North West Russia.

Interests 
Author of 13 academic texts to date, Vyacheslav Zarenkov is also the holder of 84 patents. He is the President of the International Fund for the Restoration of Historical and Cultural Monuments and engaged in numerous philanthropic activities including the trusteeship of schools and restoration of churches. His painting is also widely-exhibited and he is an active participant in the Saint Petersburg arts community.

Honours 
In 2007, Vyacheslav Adamovich Zarenkov was presented the award 'Honoured Builder of the Russian Federation' by Vladimir Putin in Moscow.

References 

1951 births
Living people
Belarusian businesspeople
Russian construction businesspeople
Russian inventors
Businesspeople from Saint Petersburg
Russian businesspeople in Cyprus